Emilia Frances Noel  (9 February 1868 – 19 March 1950) was a British botanist, author, and illustrator.

Born in Kensington, she was the youngest daughter of Hon. Henry Lewis Noel and granddaughter of Charles Noel, 1st Earl of Gainsborough. She was educated at Somerville College, Oxford. She traveled internationally, and is noted for her writings about and collection of Kashmir plants; her journals are now in the National Archives. She was elected a Fellow of the Linnean Society of London in 1905.

References

External links

1868 births
1950 deaths
People from Kensington
Emilia Frances
19th-century British botanists
20th-century British botanists
Alumni of Somerville College, Oxford
British illustrators
British women biologists
British women writers
19th-century women writers